Tan Ling Houw (born 26 July 1930) is an Indonesian former footballer. He competed in the men's tournament at the 1956 Summer Olympics.

Honours

Indonesia
Asian Games Bronze medal: 1958

References

External links
 
 

1930 births
Living people
Indonesian footballers
Indonesian people of Chinese descent
Indonesia international footballers
Olympic footballers of Indonesia
Footballers at the 1956 Summer Olympics
Sportspeople from Surabaya
Indonesian sportspeople of Chinese descent
Association football midfielders
Persija Jakarta players
Asian Games medalists in football
Medalists at the 1958 Asian Games
Asian Games bronze medalists for Indonesia
Footballers at the 1958 Asian Games
20th-century Indonesian people